The following highways are numbered 156:

Brazil
 BR-156

Canada
 Prince Edward Island Route 156 (Palmer Road)

Costa Rica
 National Route 156

India
 National Highway 156 (India)

Japan
 Japan National Route 156

United States
 U.S. Route 156 (former)
 Alabama State Route 156
 Arkansas Highway 156
 California State Route 156
 Connecticut Route 156
 Georgia State Route 156
 Illinois Route 156
 Indiana State Road 156
 Iowa Highway 156 (former)
 K-156 (Kansas highway)
 Kentucky Route 156
 Louisiana Highway 156
 Maine State Route 156
 Maryland Route 156
 M-156 (Michigan highway)
 Minnesota State Highway 156
 Missouri Route 156
 Nevada State Route 156
 New Hampshire Route 156
 New Jersey Route 156
 New Mexico State Road 156
 New York State Route 156
Ohio State Route 156 (former)
 Oklahoma State Highway 156
 Pennsylvania Route 156
 Tennessee State Route 156
 Texas State Highway 156
 Texas State Highway Spur 156
 Utah State Route 156
 Virginia State Route 156
 Wisconsin Highway 156
 Wyoming Highway 156
Territories
 Puerto Rico Highway 156